Montage may refer to:

Arts and entertainment

Filmmaking and films 
 Montage (filmmaking), a technique in film editing
 Montage (2013 film), a South Korean film

Music 
 Montage (music), or sound collage
 Montage (EP), a 2017 EP by Block B
 Montage (Charlene Choi album), 2012
 Montage (Kenny G album), 1990
 Montage (Savoy Records album), 1955
 Montage (Yen Town Band album), 1996
 Montage (Yulia album), 2006
 Montage, an album by Kahimi Karie, 2004
 Montage Music Group, a former American independent record label

Other arts and entertainment
 Photomontage, the process and result of making a composite photograph
 Montage (TV series), a filmed history of the 1960s and 1970s

Businesses
 Montage Hotels & Resorts, a luxury hotel and resort management company
 Le Bistro Montage, or simply Montage, a restaurant in Portland, Oregon, U.S.

Software 
 Montage (image software), used in astrophotography to assemble astronomical images 
 Montage (software), screenwriting software
 MontageJS, open-source JavaScript framework software

Other uses
 Manta Montage, a car
 Montage tower, CityPlace, Toronto, Canada
 The Montage Reno, Nevada, U.S., a high-rise residential building in Reno, Nevada
 Montage Mountain, Pennsylvania, U.S. - see Montage Mountain Ski Resort
 Le Montage, a novel by Vladimir Volkoff

See also